Martha Davis may refer to:

 Martha Davis (musician), lead singer-songwriter of the new wave band The Motels
 Martha Davis (singer) (1917–1960), vocalist and pianist who performed as "Martha Davis and Spouse"
 Martha Davis (author) (born 1957), professor of law and author
 Martha Ellen Davis, anthropologist and ethnomusicologist